The 11th Pan American Games were held in Havana, Cuba from August 2 to August 18, 1991.

Medals

Gold

Men's 1.000m Time Trial (Track): Gene Samuel

Silver

Men's 400 metres: Ian Morris

Results by event

See also
Trinidad and Tobago at the 1992 Summer Olympics

References
T&T Olympic Committee

Nations at the 1991 Pan American Games
P
1991